The McConnell–McGuire Building is a historic building in Moscow, Idaho. It was built in 1891, for the McConnell-McGuire department store. One of its founders, William J. McConnell, served as the third governor of Idaho from 1893 to 1897.

The building was designed by architects W. J. Lewis and M. D. Ogilbee. It has been listed on the National Register of Historic Places since February 7, 1978.

References

Commercial buildings on the National Register of Historic Places in Idaho
National Register of Historic Places in Latah County, Idaho
Buildings and structures completed in 1891
Department stores on the National Register of Historic Places